James Stephen Cummins (born May 15, 1970) is an American former professional ice hockey player. Cummins was drafted 67th overall by the New York Rangers in the 1989 NHL Entry Draft. He played 12 seasons in the National Hockey League (NHL) for the Detroit Red Wings, Philadelphia Flyers, Tampa Bay Lightning, Chicago Blackhawks, Phoenix Coyotes, Montreal Canadiens, Mighty Ducks of Anaheim, New York Islanders, and Colorado Avalanche.

Playing career
As a youth, Cummins played in the 1983 Quebec International Pee-Wee Hockey Tournament with the Michigan Dynamos minor ice hockey team.

Cummins spent three years with the Michigan State Spartans before going pro. While in college, Cummins established himself as an enforcer. Cummins brought the same intensity to the NHL, where he quickly established a reputation among fellow heavyweights. He made his NHL debut on March 8, 1991 with the Detroit Red Wings. The Red Wings traded Cummins to the Philadelphia Flyers in June 1993.

On March 18, 1994, Cummins was traded by the Flyers to the Tampa Bay Lightning in exchange for Rob DiMaio.

While playing with the Chicago Blackhawks in 1996, Cummins was suspended eight games and fined $1,000 for an altercation during a game against the Florida Panthers.

Cummins' 2001–02 season began slowly after enduring an abdominal injury during training camp with the Ducks. He returned to the lineup only to be injured again and sent to their minor league affiliate, the Cincinnati Mighty Ducks. On January 14, 2002, Cummins was traded to the New York Islanders in exchange for Dave Roche. Then Islanders General Manager, Mike Milbury, had brought him in to give the team some toughness. Cummins originally retired after the 2001–2002 season, but returned to play for the Colorado Avalanche during the 2003–2004 season. After one season with the Avalanche, he retired for good in 2004.

, Cummins is currently an amateur scout for the Calgary Flames.

Career statistics

References

External links
 

1970 births
Living people
Adirondack Red Wings players
American men's ice hockey right wingers
Atlanta Knights players
Calgary Flames scouts
Chicago Blackhawks players
Colorado Avalanche players
Detroit Red Wings players
Hershey Bears players
Ice hockey players from Michigan
Michigan State Spartans men's ice hockey players
Mighty Ducks of Anaheim players
Montreal Canadiens players
New York Islanders players
New York Rangers draft picks
Sportspeople from Dearborn, Michigan
Philadelphia Flyers players
Phoenix Coyotes players
Tampa Bay Lightning players